The 2001 Pan American Aerobic Gymnastics Championships were held in Santiago, Chile. The competition was organized by the Chilean Gymnastics Federation.

Medalists

References

2001 in gymnastics
International gymnastics competitions hosted by Chile
2001 in Chilean sport
Pan American Gymnastics Championships